Conus retifer, common name the netted cone, is a species of sea snail, a marine gastropod mollusk in the family Conidae, the cone snails and their allies.

Like all species within the genus Conus, these snails are predatory and venomous. They are capable of "stinging" humans, therefore live ones should be handled carefully or not at all.

Description
The size of the shell varies between 25 mm and 69 mm. The shell is pear-shaped, with revolving striae. Its color is reticulated orange-brown with large and small triangular white patches, and zigzag longitudinal chocolate markings, mostly interrupted so as to form one or two bands. The interior of the aperture is light violaceous.

Distribution
This marine species has a wide distribution in the tropical Indo-West Pacific: Mozambique, Tanzania, the Mascarene Islands, Indo-China, Indo-Malaysia, Oceania; and off Australia (Christmas Island)

References

  Menke, K.T. 1829. Verzeichniss der ansehnlischen Conchylien-Sammlung der Freiherrn von der Malsburg. Pyrmonti : Publisher not known pp. i-vi, 1–123.
 Sowerby, G.B. (1st) 1834. Conus. pls 54–57 in Sowerby, G.B. (2nd) (ed). The Conchological Illustrations or coloured figures of all the hitherto unfigured recent shells. London : G.B. Sowerby (2nd).
 Sowerby, G.B. (1st) 1841. The Conchological Illustrations or coloured figures of all the hitherto unfigured recent shells. London : G.B. Sowerby (2nd) 200 pls.
 Salvat, B. & Rives, C. 1975. Coquillages de Polynésie. Tahiti : Papéete Les editions du pacifique, pp. 1–391.
 Cernohorsky, W.O. 1978. Tropical Pacific Marine Shells. Sydney : Pacific Publications 352 pp., 68 pls. 
 Kay, E.A. 1979. Hawaiian Marine Shells. Reef and shore fauna of Hawaii. Section 4 : Mollusca. Honolulu, Hawaii : Bishop Museum Press Bernice P. Bishop Museum Special Publication Vol. 64(4) 653 pp. 
 Drivas, J.; Jay, M. (1987). Coquillages de La Réunion et de l'Île Maurice. Collection Les Beautés de la Nature. Delachaux et Niestlé: Neuchâtel. . 159 pp.
 Wilson, B. 1994. Australian Marine Shells. Prosobranch Gastropods. Kallaroo, WA : Odyssey Publishing Vol. 2 370 pp. 
 Röckel, D., Korn, W. & Kohn, A.J. 1995. Manual of the Living Conidae. Volume 1: Indo-Pacific Region. Wiesbaden : Hemmen 517 pp.
 Puillandre N., Duda T.F., Meyer C., Olivera B.M. & Bouchet P. (2015). One, four or 100 genera? A new classification of the cone snails. Journal of Molluscan Studies. 81: 1-23

External links
 The Conus Biodiversity website
 Cone Shells - Knights of the Sea
 

retifer
Gastropods described in 1829